Aspatria Rugby Union Football Club is based in Aspatria, Cumbria (formerly Cumberland) in north west England, not far from the Scottish Border. They are nicknamed the "Black Reds", and have a red cockerel as their logo.

They currently play in North West 2 - a tier 6 league in the English rugby union system - division for the 2022/2023 season following the promotion in 2021/2022 from tier 7.

They are not to be confused with the Aspatria Hornets, the local rugby league team.

Club Honours
1st team:
Cumbria Cup winners (32): 1883, 1885, 1891, 1892, 1896, 1899, 1909, 1911, 1912, 1923, 1928, 1929, 1930, 1937, 1938, 1977, 1978, 1980, 1981, 1982, 1983, 1984, 1985, 1987, 1988, 1989, 1990, 1992, 1993, 1996, 1999, 2013
North 2 champions: 1987-88
North 1 champions: 1990-91
Courage National Division 4 North champions: 1991-92
North Lancs/Cumbria champions: 2010-11
Cumbria League Cup winners 2018/9

2nd team:
Cumbria Shield winners (16): 1907, 1922, 1924, 1925, 1929, 1930, 1933, 1938, 1981, 1982, 1983, 1993, 1994, 1999, 2002, 2006

Notable players
Aspatria has produced several international / representative players:
 Joseph Blacklock
 James Davidson
 Joseph Davidson
 David Graham
 Steve Hanley
 Thomas Holliday, seven  caps, 1924 British Lions tour to South Africa, and later rugby league player for Oldham R.L.F.C. and the England national rugby league team.
 Robert Jackson Hanvey
 Rob Miller now plays for London Wasps. He is the top try scorer in the Aviva Premiership 2011/2012 season and was called up to the England Saxons 05/07/2012 by head coach Stuart Lancaster but subsequently lost his place before the 2013 Six Nations competition.
David Pears England International.
 Mark Richardson represented Barbarian F. C. 1997 v Leicester Tigers

References
 Goodwin, Terry The Complete Who's Who of International Rugby (Blandford Press, England, 1987)

Bibliography

External links
 Official website
 Police probe rugby union eye injury

English rugby union teams
Rugby clubs established in 1875
Rugby union in Cumbria
Aspatria